Maria Oberbreyer (née Trösch; born 22 November 1921) is an Austrian sprinter. She competed in the women's 100 metres at the 1948 Summer Olympics.

References

External links
 

1921 births
Possibly living people
Athletes (track and field) at the 1948 Summer Olympics
Austrian female sprinters
Austrian female hurdlers
Austrian female long jumpers
Olympic athletes of Austria